Paula Belén Pareto (born 16 January 1986) is an Argentine retired judoka and physician. She was the flag bearer for her country at the closing ceremony of the 2016 Summer Olympics held in Rio de Janeiro, Brazil. She competed at the 2020 Summer Olympics.

Biography
Paula, nicknamed "La Peque" (The small one), was born in San Fernando, Argentina. She lives with her parents in Tigre, close to the capital city. She began swimming at the age of four, and a year later, she took up gymnastics. Her inspiration for judo arose when she was 9, and her younger brother Marco came home from school beaten up. Her father, Aldo, used to practice judo when he was young, so he decided to send Marco to a judo club. Paula was curious and wanted to go too.

Her first judo club was Club San Fernando. She soon won her first tournament, and when she decided to continue practicing judo, she moved to bigger Club Estudiantes de La Plata. First years she competed in the −44 kg division but later moved up to the −48 kg category.

She is a big football fan and plays football with her friends. She had a period when she wanted to play football professionally, but she left the idea to pursue her judo career after that. Her favorite club is Boca Juniors and her home club Estudiantes de La Plata.

During the 2008 Summer Olympics in Beijing, in an interview said that she is single, and her mother Mirta commented that it was like "You are engaged to judo".

Paula has a younger brother called Marco, who is supporting her on her journeys around world tournaments, and an older sister called Estefanía who is a psychologist.

She studied medicine at the University of Buenos Aires and graduated in March 2014.

In November 2010, Paula was granted the Platinum Konex Award as Argentina's best sportswoman of the last decade. In December 2015, she received the Gold Olimpia Award as the best athlete of the year from her country.

Judo
She won the bronze medal at 2008 Summer Olympics in one of the most dramatic matches of the whole tournament. She stood against Pak Ok-Song from North Korea. The Korean judoka was active the whole match and got a koka in the middle of the match for activity. Drama came in the last 10 seconds when Pak began a technique, but Paula made use of it for her technique, which was a counter to the Korean's move. Problems arose when the jury counted the technique for Pak, perhaps because she began to move first. In the end, Pak celebrated the medal, and Paula cried, but her trainer Carlos Denegri lodged an objection, so the jury checked the video. Finally, they agreed that it was Pareto who made the technique (Kuchiki-taoshi), and so she took the medal.

She is also very successful in continental games and championships like Pan American Games.

In August 2015, Paula won the gold medal at the World Judo Championship in Astana, Kazakhstan, her first world title. At the 2016 Summer Olympics, Paula defeated Jeong Bo-kyeong to capture her first Olympic gold medal.

Achievements

References

External links

 
 
 
 

1986 births
Living people
Argentine female judoka
Argentine people of Italian descent
Argentine women physicians
Judoka at the 2007 Pan American Games
Judoka at the 2008 Summer Olympics
Judoka at the 2012 Summer Olympics
Judoka at the 2011 Pan American Games
Judoka at the 2015 Pan American Games
Pan American Games gold medalists for Argentina
Pan American Games silver medalists for Argentina
Pan American Games bronze medalists for Argentina
People from San Fernando de la Buena Vista
Olympic judoka of Argentina
Olympic bronze medalists for Argentina
Sportspeople from Buenos Aires Province
Olympic medalists in judo
Medalists at the 2008 Summer Olympics
Medalists at the 2016 Summer Olympics
Olympic gold medalists for Argentina
Judoka at the 2016 Summer Olympics
University of Buenos Aires alumni
Pan American Games medalists in judo
South American Games gold medalists for Argentina
South American Games silver medalists for Argentina
South American Games medalists in judo
World judo champions
Competitors at the 2006 South American Games
Competitors at the 2010 South American Games
Competitors at the 2014 South American Games
Medalists at the 2007 Pan American Games
Medalists at the 2011 Pan American Games
Medalists at the 2015 Pan American Games
Judoka at the 2020 Summer Olympics
20th-century Argentine women
21st-century Argentine women